The Knob is a mountain in Barnstable County, Massachusetts. Swifts Hill is located northeast of The Knob.

References

Mountains of Massachusetts
Mountains of Barnstable County, Massachusetts